Cyprus participated in the Junior Eurovision Song Contest 2008 as host country. Elena Mannouri and Charis Savva represented the country with the song "Gioupi gia!".

Before Junior Eurovision

National final
The final was held on 28 June 2008, hosted by Christiana Stavrou and Kiriakos Pastides. The winner was chosen by a combination of votes from a professional jury (40%) and public televoting (60%).

At Junior Eurovision

Voting

Notes

References 

Cyprus
2008
Junior Eurovision Song Contest